A special election was held in  on October 16, 1820 and November 24, 1820 to fill a vacancy caused by the resignation of Zabdiel Sampson (DR) on July 26, 1820.

Election results
Although a majority was achieved on the first ballot, a second election was ordered because elections had not been held in the town of Hanson.

Hobart took his seat on December 18, 1820

See also
List of special elections to the United States House of Representatives

References

Massachusetts 1820 08
Massachusetts 1820 08
1820 08
Massachusetts 08
United States House of Representatives 08
United States House of Representatives 1820 08